Eucalyptus cunninghamii, commonly known as cliff mallee ash, is a species of mallee that is endemic to the Blue Mountains in New South Wales. It has smooth grey bark, often with insect "scribbles", linear to narrow lance-shaped adult leaves, flowers buds in groups of seven or nine, white flowers and urn-shaped, barrel-shaped or more or less spherical fruit. It grows on cliff edges and upper edges of valleys.

Description
It has smooth grey bark, often with insect scribbles, that is shed in ribbons. Flowering occurs between September and December and the flowers are white.

Taxonomy and naming
Cliff mallee ash was first formally described in 1825 by Allan Cunningham who gave it the name Eucalyptus microphylla and published the description in Barron Field's book, Geographical Memoirs on New South Wales. The name was a nomen illegitimum because it had already been used by Willdenow for a different species, but in 1830 Robert Sweet changed the name to E. cunninghamii in honour of Cunningham.

Distribution and habitat
This eucalypt is restricted to the Blue Mountains where it grows in shallow soil derived from sandstone and is found on cliff edges and the upper edges of valleys.

References 

cunninghamii
Myrtales of Australia
Flora of New South Wales
Mallees (habit)
Plants described in 1830
Taxa named by Allan Cunningham (botanist)